Asheton is a surname. Notable people with the surname include:
 Ron Asheton (1948–2009), American guitarist
 Scott Asheton (1949–2014), American drummer